Chanesar railway station (Sindhi: چنيسر ريلوي اسٽيشن), also known as Chanesar Halt, is a train station located in Karachi, Pakistan, near the village of Chanesar Goth.

See also
 List of railway stations in Pakistan
 Pakistan Railways

References

External links

Railway stations in Karachi
Railway stations on Karachi Circular Railway